The following is a compilation of notable records and statistics for teams and players in and seasons of National Premier Soccer League.

Regular season

All-Time Championship Game Performance

All-Time Regular Season Records
Through completion of 2013 regular season.

* Missing GF/GA/GD for 2006 & 2007 Seasons, Missing W/L/T & GF/GA/GD for 2008 Season with the exception of Atlanta Silverbacks Reserves, Performance FC Phoenix, Rocket City United, San Diego United, Arizona Sahuaros and Albuquerque Asylum for which W/L/T is included for 2008 Season but GF/GA/GD is missing.
** Alabama Spirit though scheduled to complete in 2008 never played a game

Best Regular Season Record by Year

Best regular season record determined by average points per game since the number of games played varies
* Team did not score the most overall points during the year but had best average points per game

All-Time Regular Season Division / Conference Championships

All-Time Regular Season Attendance Bests

U.S. Open Cup

U.S. Open Cup Performance by Year 
Through completion of 2013 regular season.

Automatic entries granted to NPSL teams starting with 2011 tournament
* Chico Rooks qualified for 2003 tournament before the MPSL officially began play
† Arizona Sahuaros competed in the USASA from 2005 thru 2007 as well as 2009 and 2010 seasons but were officially on hiatus from the NPSL due to the lack of a Southwest Conference''''‡ Indois USA joined the NPSL for the 2007 season and qualified for the U.S. Open Cup before competing within the NPSL♣ Milwaukee Bavarians completed in 2009 USASA while on hiatus from NPSL¶ Brooklyn Italians joined the NPSL for the 2010 season and qualified for the U.S. Open Cup before competing within the NPSL All-Time U.S. Open Cup Appearances and Performance 

 *Atlanta FC now known as Atlanta Silverbacks Reserves and Fullerton Rangers now known as Orange County Pateadores''

See also
 Major League Soccer records and statistics
 North American Soccer League records and statistics

References

Records and statistics
All-time football league tables
Association football league records and statistics